Heliotropium riebeckii is a species of plant in the family Boraginaceae. It is endemic to Yemen.  Its natural habitats are subtropical or tropical dry shrubland and subtropical or tropical wet lowland grassland.

References

Endemic flora of Socotra
riebeckii
Vulnerable plants
Taxonomy articles created by Polbot